The Malaysia Super League is the men's top professional football division of the Malaysian football league system. Administered by the Football Malaysia Limited Liability Partnership (FMLLP), now known as the Malaysian Football League (MFL), the Malaysia Super League is contested by 14 teams. Until 2023, it operated on a system of promotion and relegation with the Malaysia Premier League, with the two lowest-placed teams relegated and replaced by the promoted top two teams in that division. The league replaced the former top-tier league, Liga Perdana 1 in the Malaysian football league system, which ran from 1998 to 2003.

36 clubs have competed in the division since the inception of the Malaysia Super League in 2004, with eight teams winning the title (Selangor, Kedah Darul Aman, Kelantan, Sri Pahang, Perlis, Negeri Sembilan, LionsXII and Johor Darul Ta'zim). The current champions are Johor Darul Ta'zim, which won their ninth title in the 2022 edition.

History

Origins 

The Malaysia Super League was formed in 2004 following a decision by the Football Association of Malaysia (FAM) to privatise the league. The inaugural season started on 14 February 2004. As a result, the Malaysia Super League Sdn Bhd (or MSL Proprietary Limited) was created to oversee the marketing aspects of the league, but it was not fully privatised.

The league has seen numerous changes to its format from eight clubs, at one point 14 clubs and now 12 clubs to accommodate changes to the league rules and withdrawal of certain clubs from the league in order to create a competitive environment and professional management among the clubs.

Foundation 

The Malaysian League was revamped to be a fully professional league in 2004 which coined the creation of a new top-tier division, the Malaysia Super League. Between 2004 to 2006, the professional football league in Malaysia was divided into two levels and two groups:
 Top tier: Malaysia Super League (8 teams)
 Second tier: Malaysia Premier League Group A (8 teams)
 Second tier: Malaysia Premier League Group B (8 teams)
 Third tier: Malaysia FAM Cup

The new top-tier Malaysia Super League was competed by eight teams while there were 16 teams competing in the new Malaysia Premier League which was divided into 2 groups. While there were only eight teams in the league prior to the 2006-07 season, positional movements were radical. Successive losses would condemn clubs to a relegation dogfight. Similarly, successive wins would put a team in contention for the title. The Malaysia Super League had gone through two format changes in its short history spanning three years. The Football Association of Malaysia (FAM) decided to expand the Malaysia Super League to accommodate 14 teams instead of eight, which was the number of league teams during the Malaysia Super League's first three seasons. But the plan was held off when some of the teams withdrew from the league due to financial reasons. The 2009 to 2012 seasons were the only seasons that the league would have 14 teams, with all teams playing each other twice culminating in 26 matches per team and 182 matches in total.

For the 2007 season, the Malaysia Premier League was combined into one division rather than two groups and in 2008 the Malaysia FAM League was revamped to a league format instead of a knockout competition format, with the latter itself replaced by a new third tier called the Malaysia M3 League in 2019:
 Top tier: Malaysia Super League
 Second tier: Malaysia Premier League
 Third tier: Malaysia M3 League

Development 
In 2015, the Football Malaysia Limited Liability Partnership (FMLLP) was created in the course of the privatisation of the Malaysian football league system. The partnership saw all 24 teams in the Malaysia Super League and the Malaysia Premier League involved, the Football Association of Malaysia (FAM) as the Managing Partner and MP & Silva as a special partner (FAM's global media and commercial advisor) to become stakeholders in the company.

The FMLLP owned, operated and ran the Malaysia Super League. Besides that, other competitions in Malaysian football were also under its jurisdiction, which include the Malaysia Premier League, the Malaysia FA Cup, the Malaysia Cup, and the Piala Sumbangsih. It aimed to transform and move Malaysian football forward to another level.

More than a decade after the league's inception, a total of eight clubs have been crowned champions of the Malaysia Super League with Pahang being the first champions. Johor Darul Ta'zim have won the league 7 times while Kedah, Selangor, and Kelantan have won the league twice each; Pahang, Perlis, Negeri Sembilan and LionsXII have won it once. On 9 September 2016, Johor Darul Ta'zim became the first team to win the Malaysia Super League three times consecutively.

Competition format and regulations

Competition
The competition format follows the usual double round-robin format. During the course of a season, which lasts from February to July, each club plays every other club twice, once at home and once away, for 22 matchdays, totaling 132 matches in the season. Most games are played on Saturdays, with a few games played during weekdays. Teams receive three points for a win, one point for a draw, and no points for a loss. Teams are ranked by total points, with the highest-ranked club at the end of the season crowned champions.

Promotion and relegation
A system of promotion and relegation existed between the Malaysia Super League and the Malaysia Premier League. The two lowest placed teams in the Malaysia Super League were relegated to the Malaysia Premier League, and the top two teams from the Malaysia Premier League were promoted to the Malaysia Super League. Below is a complete record of how many teams played in each season throughout the league's history:

Number of clubs throughout the years

Qualification for AFC competitions
The champions of the Malaysia Super League qualify for following season's AFC Champions League group stages. The winners of the Malaysia FA Cup also qualify for the following season's AFC Champions League play-off slots. If a club lost during the play-off slots and were unable to reach group stages, the club will play in the AFC Cup play-off slots.

The number of places allocated to Malaysian clubs in AFC competitions is dependent upon the AFC Club Competitions Rankings, which are calculated based upon the performance of teams competing in the AFC Champions League and the AFC Cup, as well as their national team's FIFA World Rankings in the previous 4 years. Currently, Malaysia are ranked 20th in the AFC Club Competitions Ranking.

Club licensing regulations 
Every team in the Malaysia Super League must have a licence to play in the league, or else they are expelled completely from the Malaysian Football League. To obtain a licence, teams must be financially healthy and meet certain standards of conduct such as organizational management. As part of the privatisation efforts of the league, all clubs competing in the Malaysia Super League will be required to obtain FAM Club Licensing.

As a preliminary preparation towards the total privatisation of the league, FAM Club Licensing was created with the hope of it being enforced throughout the Malaysia Super League fully by the end of 2018 and in the Malaysia Premier League by end of 2019. There are significant benefits of being in the top-division and readiness of the club licensing:
 A greater share of television broadcast licence revenues going to clubs.
 Greater exposure through television and higher attendance levels to help clubs attract more lucrative sponsorships.
 Clubs developing substantial financial muscle through the combination of television and gate revenues, sponsorship and marketing of their team brands. This allows clubs to attract and retain the best players from domestic and international sources and to construct first-class stadium facilities.

FAM also established independent decision making bodies known as the First Instance Body and Appeals Body that would function as an assessment body and the issuer of the license. These two bodies are composed of members that meet the requirements and conditions set by the AFC Club Licensing Regulations mainly within the field of finance and legal matters.

Champion 
36 clubs have played in the Malaysia Super League since its inception in 2004, up to and including the 2023 season.

Season-by-season records

Titles by club

2023 season

Other clubs 
The following clubs that had competed in the Malaysia Super League or the top flight M-League before 2004 but are not competing in the Malaysia Super League during the 2023 season.

Privatisation of the league's football clubs 
The Pahang Football Association became the first FAM affiliate to separate itself from the management of its football team with the formation of Sri Pahang F.C. which was now under the management of Pahang FC Sdn Bhd starting from the 2016 Malaysia Super League season onwards.

On 10 January 2016, Johor Football Association became the second FAM affiliate to follow suit when it separated itself from the management of its football team and changing its focus to state football development and the state league while the football team became its own entity as Johor Darul Ta'zim F.C.

On 1 November 2016, Melaka United Soccer Association became the third FAM affiliate to follow suit with the privatisation of its football team as a separate entity known as Melaka United F.C. for the 2017 Malaysia Super League season onwards.

On 6 November 2016, the FMLLP released an update regarding the club licensing progress where currently only Johor Darul Ta'zim F.C. obtained the CLR while others were still in progress with 80 percent of the requirements completed. All member clubs in the Malaysia Super League and the Malaysia Premier League were required to obtain the CLR with the Malaysia Super League clubs required to obtain it by September 2017 while the Malaysia Premier League clubs were given an extended period from 2019 to 2020 as some clubs had only met 50 percent of the requirements completed. The FMLLP had also suggested the FAM to ensure that clubs in the Malaysia FAM League to meet certain guidelines as this will allow them to get their license if they were to be promoted to the Malaysia Premier League.

In February 2017, the FMLLP released a statement regarding the official status of Johor Darul Ta'zim and [[Johor Darul Ta'zim II F.C.
]] where Johor FA changed its name to Johor Darul Ta'zim II and became an official feeder club for Johor Darul Ta'zim when the feeder club agreement between both clubs were approved on 19 August 2016. Through the agreement, both clubs were allowed an additional four player transfer quota which can be used outside the normal transfer windows for players between both clubs. The feeder club was also required to register a minimum of 12 players under the age of 23 for its squad from 2017. A feeder club will be required to be in the league below the main club at all times which meant that Johor Darul Ta'zim II will never be allowed to get promoted even if the club managed to win the Malaysia Premier League. By 2018, the feeder club must field four players under the age of 23 in their first eleven during match day and the feeder club were allowed to play in other cup competitions where the parent club competed such as the Malaysia Cup and the Malaysia FA Cup.

Organisation

Logo evolution 
Since the inception of the league in 2004, numerous logos have been introduced for the league to reflect the sponsorships and naming rights. In its inaugural season, the Dunhill logo was incorporated as a title sponsor and it was the only season sponsored by the tobacco company before tobacco advertising was banned in the country.

From 2005 to 2010, the Malaysia Super League incorporated the TM brand as part of its logo as the title sponsor.

After the end of TM sponsorship's which lasted for seven consecutive years, FAM launched a new logo for the 2011 season where the league was partnered with Astro Media as a strategic partner for the Malaysia Super League's marketing. The Astro brand was only incorporated as part of the Malaysia Super League logo from 2012 until 2014.

In the 2015 season, no title sponsor was incorporated when the league was sponsored by MP & Silva. For the 2016 season a new logo was introduced as part of the takeover of the league by the FMLLP. In 2018 and 2019, the Malaysia Super League logo included the Unifi brand logo as part of the league's sponsorship deal.

In the 2023 season, Malaysian Football League (MFL) unveiled a new logo.

Logo and trophy 
The 2018 Malaysia Super League logo was formed as a part of a rebranding due to title sponsorship reasons with TM under the Unifi brand. TM's Unifi brand was the new title sponsor for the Malaysia Super League and the Malaysia Cup following an eight-year partnership deal worth RM480mil until 2025. But, TM pulled out as a sponsor at the end 2019 in order to save costs.

The Malaysia Super League trophy is the prize for the twelve clubs that are competing for it in the league. Designed to be futuristic and elegant, the new trophy depicts a football on a pedestal, reflecting on the importance placed on winning the Malaysia Super League. It costs roughly close to RM200,000 (US$48597.00)

Standing at a height of 63.3 centimeters and 25.2 centimeters in diameter, the 20 kilogram trophy is made of copper, silver and 24 carat pure gold. The trophy was designed and crafted to precision by the Royal goldsmith in Johor, taking eight months from the initial design phase to completion. The gold portions are to symbolise the exclusivity of winning the Malaysia Super League after enduring a tough long successful campaign. It inspires the teams to battle with all their might to get their name on the trophy.

Sponsorship

Finances 
The FMLLP introduced a merit-point system in the 2016 season. Points will be awarded based on a team's league position, progress in the Cup competitions (Malaysia FA Cup and Malaysia Cup) and the number of live matches shown. A point in the season is worth RM41,000.

The money will be distributed twice per season. First during the early part of the season where teams will receive a basic payment out of that particular year's league sponsorship and the second payment will be received at the end of the season where all the merit-points have been calculated. For the 2016 season, the first basic payment consisted of a 30 percent cut out of RM70 Million in league sponsorship that equates to RM21 million which will be distributed among the 24 teams in the Malaysia Super League and Malaysia Premier League.

Teams in the Malaysian League have quite often been involved in financial problems as their spending was more than their revenue. The Professional Footballers Association of Malaysia (PFAM) is one of the active members in pursuing the issue of unpaid salaries. In January 2016, PFAM president suggested a couple of solutions to promote financial sustainability on the competing teams' part where the teams should make long-term investments by operating according to their budgets and requiring teams' wage bills to be no bigger than 60 percent of their total spending. Other suggestions included that salaries to be deducted directly from team grants and winning prizes, to points being deducted from teams experiencing payment issues, and a ruling that requires teams to settle all their late salary payments before the start of every new season.

In response to these issues, the FMLLP decided that at the start of the 2016 season, football clubs would be given warnings with the deduction of three league points if they failed to pay a player's salary. If the problem persists, it will affect the licence of the clubs. When the club licence is withdrawn, the team will not be able to compete in the next season. If the team does not adopt the right structure, they will be left behind and club licensing will be a problem for them, and the team will drop out from competing in the Malaysian Football League.

Other than this, each teams must gain revenue from sponsorship deals from local, regional and international sponsors for their team.

Media coverage 
Radio Televisyen Malaysia (RTM), a free-to-air channel have been broadcasting the Malaysian League for years even before the formation of the Malaysia Super League. They continued to broadcast the league most of the time exclusively until the end of 2010 where Astro Media were announced as sponsors and managed the broadcasting rights of the league for four years spanning from 2011 until the 2014 season. During this time, the league was broadcast to one of the cable channels of Astro Media, which was Astro Arena alongside the RTM for the free-to-air broadcast.

In 2015, Astro lost the broadcasting rights for the league where the rights were given to Media Prima, a parent company of multiple free-to-air channels alongside RTM.

The broadcasting rights for the 2016 season was given to Media Prima for three years with a maximum of three games in each matchweek that was shown live on television.

In 2018, TM bought the exclusive rights of the coverage until 2025. The coverage was aired by Unifi TV (excluding 2019), iflix (until 2019), Media Prima (until 2019), and RTM (excluding 2019).

From matchweek 5 in the 2020 season, all remaining league matches were made available worldwide for free via the official Unifi YouTube channel.

Current

Former

Players

All-time top scorers

Golden Boot winners

Foreign players and transfer regulations 
The Foreign players policy has changed multiple times since the league's inception. In 2009, FAM took a drastic measure when they changed the foreign players policy that banned foreign players from playing in the league until 2011. Foreign players were only allowed be back into the league starting from the 2012 season onwards.

All foreign players must obtain the International Transfer Certificate from their previous national football governing bodies that their previous clubs were affiliated to before they can be register with the FAM in order to play in the Malaysia Super League.
 2009–2011: foreign players banned.
 2012: 2 foreign players.
 2013: 3 foreign players.
 2014: 4 foreign players and only 3 can be on the field at a time.
 2015–2017: 4 foreign players including 1 Asian quota.
 2018–2022: 5 foreign players including 1 Asian quota and 1 Asean quota.
 2023:  9 foreign players including 1 Asian quota and 1 Asean quota but allowed only five import players to be fielded, which is three plus one Asian player and one ASEAN player

Records and achievements

Crowd attendance 
All data available to the public starting from the beginning of 2015 season.

Source: Football Association of Malaysia Management Database

Clubs ranking in Asia 
The final ranking position(s) for each participating MSL clubs in AFC Club Competitions.

*Bold denotes the highest ranked club for each year at the end of the season.

Coaches

See also 
 List of Liga Super seasons
 FAM Football Awards
 History of Malaysian football
 Expatriate footballers in Malaysia
 List of Liga Super managers
 List of foreign Malaysian League players

References

External links 
  Malaysian Football League Official Website

 
1
Top level football leagues in Asia
Sports leagues established in 2004
2004 establishments in Malaysia